Acta Archaeologica is a peer-reviewed academic journal covering new discoveries of archaeological analysis. The journal is published in English, French, German, and Italian and is published by Denmark.

Abstracting and indexing 

The journal is abstracted and indexed in:
 Abstracts in Anthropology
 Academic Search
 Anthropological Index
 Anthropological Literature
 Arts and Humanities Citation Index
 FRANCIS

References

External links 

Archaeology journals
Wiley-Blackwell academic journals
Biannual journals
Multilingual journals
Publications established in 1930
English-language journals
French-language journals
German-language journals
Italian-language journals